Scott Alanboyd Moore (born November 17, 1983) is an American former professional baseball infielder. He played in Major League Baseball (MLB) for the Chicago Cubs, Baltimore Orioles and Houston Astros. He played with the St. Louis Cardinals organization until his release in May 2015.

Professional career

Detroit Tigers 
Moore was selected in the first round of the 2002 Major League Baseball Draft as the eighth overall pick by the Detroit Tigers.

Chicago Cubs 
On February 9, 2005, Moore was traded to the Chicago Cubs alongside Roberto Novoa and Bo Flowers in exchange for pitcher Kyle Farnsworth and a player to be named later. Moore made his major league debut on September 4, 2006 against the Pittsburgh Pirates, and was hit by a pitch in his only at-bat of the game in the second inning. On September 7, he hit his first major league home run against the Pirates in a 7–5 loss. He was called up again on July 20, 2007 to start at first base against the Arizona Diamondbacks after a suspended Derrek Lee and an injured Daryle Ward left the Cubs in need of a first baseman.

Baltimore Orioles 
On August 31, 2007, Moore was traded from the Cubs to the Baltimore Orioles along with pitcher Rocky Cherry for starting pitcher Steve Trachsel.

Moore was designated for assignment on February 10,  to make room for Ty Wigginton on the 40-man roster. Moore joined the Triple-A Norfolk Tides.

Second stint with the Chicago Cubs 
On November 16, 2010, Moore signed a minor league contract with the Chicago Cubs. He played the 2011 season with the Triple-A Iowa Cubs, batting .295 with nine home runs and 53 RBI in 123 games.

Houston Astros 

The Houston Astros signed Moore to a minor league contract on November 15, 2011. After beginning the year with the Triple-A Oklahoma City RedHawks, Moore was called up on June 26, and spent the rest of the season with the Astros. In 72 games with Houston, Moore hit .259 with nine home runs and 26 RBI.

Oakland Athletics 
On November 29, 2012, Moore signed a minor league deal with the Oakland Athletics that included an invitation to Spring Training. Moore began the year with Triple-A Sacramento. In 80 games, he hit .276 with 11 home runs and 56 RBI before being released on July 19 and signing with the San Diego Padres later that day.

San Diego Padres 
On July 19, 2013, Moore signed a minor league deal with the San Diego Padres and was assigned to Triple-A Tucson. In 39 games with Tucson, he hit .260 with three home runs and 10 RBI.

St. Louis Cardinals 
On November 7, 2013, Moore signed a minor league deal with the St. Louis Cardinals. He also got an invitation to Spring Training for 2015 in Jupiter, Florida. He was released on May 18, 2015.

References

External links 

1983 births
Living people
Chicago Cubs players
Baltimore Orioles players
Houston Astros players
Major League Baseball third basemen
Baseball players from Long Beach, California
Gulf Coast Tigers players
West Michigan Whitecaps players
Lakeland Tigers players
Daytona Cubs players
West Tennessee Diamond Jaxx players
Iowa Cubs players
Norfolk Tides players
Oklahoma City RedHawks players
Sacramento River Cats players
Tucson Padres players
Memphis Redbirds players